John McChrystal Wallace (December 14, 1893 – February 7, 1989) was an American banker, philanthropist, and politician. He served in the Utah State Senate from 1933 to 1935 and as the Mayor of Salt Lake City from 1938 to 1940.

Early life and education
Wallace was born on December 14, 1893. He graduated from the University of Utah in 1916, and then attended Harvard Graduate School, receiving his master's of business administration in 1921.

Career
Wallace was a lieutenant in World War I, and later served as an aide to the United States Secretary of the Army.

Wallace served as president and chairman of Walker Bank and established the predecessor to First Interstate Bank. He had a lengthy and diverse career in business, investing in various sectors, ranging from copper mining to hog farming.

Wallace served in the Utah State Senate from 1933 to 1935, and in 1938 was appointed Mayor of Salt Lake City. He served for two years.

References

1893 births
1989 deaths
Mayors of Salt Lake City
Utah state senators
Harvard Business School alumni
University of Utah alumni
20th-century American politicians